Emanuele Vaccari (born 8 July 1966) is an Italian sailor. He competed in the Finn event at the 1992 Summer Olympics.

References

External links
 

1966 births
Living people
Italian male sailors (sport)
Olympic sailors of Italy
Sailors at the 1992 Summer Olympics – Finn
Sportspeople from Rome